Montage International (or Montage Hotels) is a luxury hotel and resort management company founded by Alan Fuerstman and based in Irvine, California. As of 2022, it operates 14 properties in the United States and Mexico, with seven of those properties under the Montage Hotels and Resorts brand and seven under its Pendry Hotels and Resorts brand.

History
 
Montage International was founded in January 2002 by Alan Fuerstman. The first major acquisition by Montage occurred in June 2002 when the company partnered with the Athens Group to purchase a development that was then known as the Laguna Beach Colony. The deal was worth $190 million, which was the highest per-room price for a hotel in the United States that year. Montage Laguna Beach was opened in 2003 and became the first hotel to bear the Montage brand. In March 2005, Montage won a municipal election that allowed them to build a new luxury hotel in the heart of Beverly Hills. Montage Beverly Hills was eventually opened in 2008. That property was later sold to the Maybourne Hotel Group.

Two years later, Montage opened its third resort, Montage Deer Valley in Park City, Utah.
 Ohana Real Estate Investors — which was created by the founder and chairman of eBay, Pierre Omidyar—provided investment backing for and ownership interest in several Montage Hotels properties, including Laguna Beach, Beverly Hills, and Deer Valley. In August 2013, Montage Hotels & Resorts expanded their portfolio to Hawaii and took over management of the Kapalua Bay property and officially became "Montage Kapalua Bay."
 
In 2014, Montage acquired management rights to the Inn at Palmetto Bluff in Bluffton, South Carolina. In October 2014, the company launched a new lifestyle brand called Pendry Hotels and Resorts. Pendry is led by Michael Fuerstman (Alan Fuerstman's eldest son) and opened their first Pendry in San Diego's Gaslamp Quarter in February 2017. Construction crews officially broke ground on the hotel on October 8, 2014.
 
In January 2015, Montage Laguna Beach was sold by Ohana Real Estate Investors to Strategic Hotels & Resorts for $360 million, which is currently the state record for the highest per-room price. Montage Hotels & Resorts continues to manage the hotel. In early 2015, Montage Hotels announced plans for their first international resort hotel in Los Cabos, Mexico on the Santa Maria Bay which officially opened in 2018.
 
In 2020, Montage purchased Matt Lowe Cay, an island in the Bahamas, with plans to build a resort.

Properties

Montage Hotels and Resorts currently manages fourteen hotels in the United States and Mexico under the Montage brand and Pendry brand. The hotels also have a residential portion which can include single-family homes, condos or villas. Each of the hotels also contain a luxury spa called "Spa Montage," with the spa at Montage Laguna Beach receiving the first ever 5 Star Spa award. As of 2022, it operates 14 properties in the United States and Mexico, with 7 of those properties under its Pendry Hotels and Resorts brand.

Montage Laguna Beach
 
Montage Laguna Beach is the flagship hotel of the Montage Hotels & Resorts brand. The hotel is built in the Craftsman style and is located directly adjacent to the Pacific Ocean and just south of downtown of Laguna Beach. It contains 250 rooms, 60 of which are suites, 37 beach bungalows, and Montage branded residences. It's built on 30 acres and incorporates artwork from William Wendt and Edgar Alwin Payne. Montage Laguna Beach has been in operation since 2003. Montage Laguna Beach was purchased by a Chicago real estate investment trust in 2015 for $360 million. It changed ownership again later in 2015 when the REIT (Strategic Hotels & Resorts) was purchased by The Blackstone Group for $6 billion. It sold again in 2022 to billionaire Tilman Fertitta.

Montage Deer Valley

Montage Deer Valley was opened in 2010 in Park City, Utah. It contains 154 guest rooms, 66 suites and 81 Montage branded residences. The resort contains indoor and outdoor meeting spaces, a ski shop, Compass Sports, a spa, a bowling alley, and four restaurants.

Montage Kapalua Bay
Montage took over management duties at the Kapalua Bay resort in 2013. Montage expanded the resort's square footage, adding a suite-only hotel with 50 units and 56 Montage branded residencies. The resort's rebrand and remodel cost an estimated $15 million, and Montage Kapalua Bay was officially opened in June 2014. The resort contains beach access near Kapalua Bay, and a Pegge Hopper art collection.

Montage Palmetto Bluff

 
Montage Palmetto Bluff came under the management of Montage Hotels and Resorts in 2014. It renovated the property to include 150 new luxury rooms in addition to the already existent 50 cottages. Montage also introduced a new spa, fitness center, and dining accommodations. Montage Palmetto Bluff is located in Bluffton, South Carolina on the banks of the May River.

Montage Healdsburg
Montage Healdsburg opened in December of 2020. Located in the center of California's wine country, Montage Healdsburg is a "refined wine country retreat." With 130 bungalow-style rooms and 40 residences for sale, Montage Healdsburg is cementing itself as a must-stay destination for those looking for an ultra-luxury experience.

Montage Los Cabos
 
Montage Los Cabo is located in Cabo San Lucas and opened in 2018. It includes a 122 room resort along with 52 residences and is listed as a AAA Five Diamond award resort.

Montage Big Sky
 
Montage Big Sky is located 45 minutes from Yellowstone National Park and has 100 rooms with ski access and private golf course. The property also includes The Inn Residences at Montage Big Sky, luxury residences.

Recognition and awards
The properties of Montage Hotels & Resorts have received numerous awards and accolades since the Montage brand debuted in 2003. Montage Laguna Beach has been honored by Andrew Harper Travels and Travel + Leisure. The flagship also received a five-star rating from the Forbes Travel Guide along with its spa and restaurant. The Condé Nast Traveler gave Montage Laguna Beach a "Gold" rank on its list of the World's Best Places to Stay. The magazine's Reader's Choice Awards have named the Laguna Beach property the best place to stay in Southern California, and the resort has also earned a AAA Five Diamond Award. The Montage Deer Valley resort was named the 17th best luxury hotel in the United States and received the AAA Five Diamond Award in 2015. All five properties were recognized by Condé Nast Traveler in 2015 with reader choice awards for The Best Hotels & Resorts in the World.

References

External links
 
 

 

American companies established in 2002
Companies based in Irvine, California
Hospitality companies established in 2002
Hospitality companies of the United States